David Jiménez may refer to:

Footballers
Diego David Jiménez (born 1979), Spanish midfielder
David Català Jiménez (born 1980), Spanish central defender
David Morillas Jiménez (born 1986), Spanish left back
David Andújar Jiménez (born 1991), Spanish central defender

Other sports personalities
David Jimenez (golfer) (1939–2013), Puerto Rican professional golfer
Antonio David Jiménez (born 1977), Spanish long-distance runner
David Jiménez (archer), represented Colombia in Archery at the 2003 Pan American Games
David Jiménez (boxer) (born 1992), Costa Rican amateur flyweight
David Jiménez (sprinter), won silver medal for Spain at the 2018 Mediterranean Games

Others
David Jiménez (journalist) (born 1971), Spanish foreign correspondent and author